Paris–Roubaix Juniors (or Le Pavé de Roubaix) is a single-day road bicycle race held annually in April in northern France for junior cyclists (aged 17 and 18) ahead of the senior Paris–Roubaix classic race. It is organised by the Vélo-Club de Roubaix Lille Métropole, who organize the under-23s version, Paris–Roubaix Espoirs.

The 2020 edition was cancelled due to the COVID-19 pandemic, with the 2021 edition moved from April to 3rd October.

Winners

External links
 

Recurring sporting events established in 2003
2003 establishments in France
Cycle races in France